Alpha Aviation may refer to:

Alpha Aviation (New Zealand)
Alpha Aviation (United Kingdom)